Libythea narina, the whitespotted beak, is a butterfly found in India that belongs to the Libytheinae group of the brush-footed butterflies family.

See also
List of butterflies of India
List of butterflies of India (Nymphalidae)

References
 
  
 
 
 
 

Libythea
Butterflies of Asia
Butterflies described in 1880